The women's singles of the 1997 Skoda Czech Open tournament was played on clay in Prague, Czech Republic.

Ruxandra Dragomir was the defending champion but lost in the second round to Ludmila Richterová.

Joannette Kruger won in the final 6–1, 6–1 against Marion Maruska.

Seeds
A champion seed is indicated in bold text while text in italics indicates the round in which that seed was eliminated.

  Brenda Schultz-McCarthy (second round)
  Ruxandra Dragomir (second round)
  Karina Habšudová (quarterfinals)
  Patty Schnyder (first round)
  Denisa Chládková (quarterfinals)
  Adriana Gerši (first round)
  Katarína Studeníková (first round)
  Sandra Kleinová (first round)

Draw

External links
 1997 Skoda Czech Open draw

1997 - Singles
Singles